Machaze District is a district of Manica Province in western Mozambique. The principal town is Machaze. The district is located in the south of the province, and borders with Mossurize District in the north, Chibabava District of Sofala Province in the northeast, Machanga District of Sofala Province in the east, Mabote District of Inhambane Province in the south, Massangena District of Gaza Province in  the southwest, and with Zimbabwe in the west. It has a population of 104,608 as of 2007.

Geography
The two main rivers in the district are the Save River, which makes the border of the district with Gaza and Inhambane Provinces, and the Buzí River.

History
In the 15th century, the area was settled by Ndau people who moved out of the Rozwi Empire to fine more fertile lands.

The district was established in 1986.

Demographics
As of 2005, 45% of the population of the district was younger than 15 years. 9% did speak Portuguese. The most common mothertongue is Chitwe language. 86% were analphabetic, mostly women.

Administrative divisions
The district is divided into two postos, Chitobe (five localities, including Machaze) and Save (four localities).

Economy
Less than 1% of the households in the district have access to electricity.

Agriculture
In the district, there are 19,000 farms which have on average  of land. The main agricultural products are corn, cassava, cowpea, peanut, sorghum, pearl millet, and sweet potato.

Transportation

References

Districts in Manica Province
States and territories established in 1986